Moquinia is a genus of flowering plants in the Moquinia tribe within the sunflower family.

The genus name of Moquinia is in honour of Alfred Moquin-Tandon (1804–1863), a French naturalist and doctor. 
It was first described and published in Prodr. Vol.7 (Issue 1) on page 22 in 1838.

 Species
Over 40 species names have been described in the genus, but nearly all of them have been transferred to other genera (Barrosoa Gochnatia Guayania Inula Llerasia Piptocarpha Pseudostifftia). Two remain in Moquinia.
 Moquinia bojeri DC. - Tanzania
 Moquinia racemosa (Spreng.) DC. - Minas Gerais, Bahia (states in Brazil)

Kew only accepts, Moquinia racemosa.

References

Asteraceae genera
Plants described in 1838
Flora of Brazil
Vernonioideae